Brachyorrhos is a genus of snakes of the family Homalopsidae.

Species
 Brachyorrhos albus (Linnaeus, 1758)
 Brachyorrhos gastrotaenius (Bleeker, 1860)
 Brachyorrhos pygmaeus Murphy & Voris, 2021
 Brachyorrhos raffrayi (Sauvage, 1879)
 Brachyorrhos wallacei Murphy, Mumpuni, de Lang, Gower & Sanders, 2012

References

Snake genera
Homalopsidae